Albrecht Dieterich (2 May 1866 – 6 May 1908) was a German classical philologist and scholar of religion born in Hersfeld.

Academic background 
He studied at the Universities of Leipzig and Bonn, where at the latter he was a student of Hermann Usener (1834-1905), who in 1899 became Dieterich's father-in-law. In 1888 he earned his doctorate, and three years later received his habilitation in Marburg with a dissertation on Orphism. Afterwards he traveled to Italy and Greece for research purposes.

In 1895 he returned to Marburg as an associate professor, and two years later succeeded Eduard Schwartz (1858-1940) as chair of classical philology at the University of Giessen. In 1903 he was a full professor at the University of Heidelberg.

Works 
Much of Dieterich's work involved research of traditional beliefs, mythology and religion of the Greco-Roman world. He was the author of an influential work titled "Abraxas: Studien zur Religionsgeschichte des spätern Altertums", a study based on a magical papyri that was housed at the Leyden Museum. In 1903 he published "Eine Mithrasliturgie", in which he proposes that lines 475 – 834 of the Paris Magical Papyrus contained the official liturgy of the Mithras Cult. His theory was met with skepticism and criticized by several scholars in regards to the Mithraic origin of the liturgy. Other significant works by Dieterich include:
 Nekyia: Beiträge zur Erklärung der neuentdeckten Petrusapokalypse, (1893) – Nekyia; contributions to the explanation of the newly revealed Apocalypse of Peter.
 Die Grabschrift des Aberkios, (1896) – The grave inscriptions of Aberkios 
 Mutter Erde, (1905) – Mother Earth. 
 Kleine Schriften, (1911) – Smaller works.

Notes

References 
 Stephan A. Hoeller, The gnostic Jung and The Seven Sermons to the dead Quest Books, 1982, p. 92. 
 "This article incorporates text from an equivalent article at the German Wikipedia"; which includes Dieterich, Albrecht In: Neue Deutsche Biographie (NDB). Band 3, Duncker & Humblot, Berlin 1957, S. 669 f.

External links
 

1866 births
1908 deaths
People from Bad Hersfeld
People from the Electorate of Hesse
German classical philologists
Academic staff of the University of Giessen
Academic staff of Heidelberg University